Montaup Electric Company , or Somerset Power LLC, was a coal- and oil-fired power plant located in Somerset, Massachusetts, USA. The plant was closed in 2010, and was owned by Asset Recovery Group of New Jersey but was auctioned off and purchased by William Thibeault in 2013. The plant was slated for eventual demolition and redevelopment of the site but since it has been under new ownership, its final purpose has yet to be decided.

See also

 List of power stations in Massachusetts

References

Somerset, Massachusetts
Former coal-fired power stations in the United States
Former oil-fired power stations in the United States
Former power stations in Massachusetts